Night lizards (family Xantusiidae) are a group of small scincomorph lizards, averaging from less than  to over  snout–vent length. Most species are viviparous (live-bearing), with the exception of those in the genus Cricosaura. The family has only three living genera, with approximately 34 living species. The genera are divided by geographic range: Xantusia in southwestern North America and Baja California, Cricosaura in Cuba, and Lepidophyma, the most populous night lizard genus, in Central America. Three fossil genera are also known: Catactegenys, Palepidophyma, Palaeoxantusia.

Biology

Night lizards were originally thought to be nocturnal because of their secretive lifestyle, but they are at least in some cases diurnal. Night lizards have evolved to live in very narrow environmental niches—"microhabitat specialization"—such as rock crevices or damp logs, and may spend their entire life under the same cover.

Physically, night lizards are characterized by relatively flat bodies and heads. Their heads are covered by large, smooth plates, while their bodies have rougher, granular skin. Their eyes, like those of snakes, are covered by immoveable, transparent membranes that function as eyelids. They feed on insects and sometimes plants.

Contrary to the reproductive strategies of most small lizards, night lizards tend to have very low reproductive rates, with several species giving birth to only one or two offspring, after a gestation period of about three months. They generally take several years to reach sexual maturity. However, the covert lifestyle of night lizards has contributed to a high life expectancy.

References

External links
Xantusiidae

 
Taxa named by Spencer Fullerton Baird